Maine (Serbian Cyrillic: Маине) is a hamlet in northern Budva, Montenegro, located by the Grđevica River, between Budva and Pobori. 
 
The area was inhabited by a small eponymous Albanian tribe, the Mahine (also called Mainjani or Maini) at the border between the Montenegrin Littoral (Primorje) and Old Montenegro in the 17th century, located below the Lovćen between the Stanjević Monastery and Budva. In the 17th century, the kadi of Ottoman Montenegro demarcated the borders between Montenegro and the maritime areas, i.e. between Budva and Mainjani. The tribe participated in the Battle of Vrtijeljka (1685). In 1838, the three small knežine of Maine, Pobori and Braići, above Budva, had 1705 inhabitants, all of Orthodox faith. The Podmaine monastery is located in the hamlet; the monastery was the gathering place of the Maine tribe who traditionally held meetings on the feast day of St. George.

References

Budva Municipality
Historical regions in Montenegro
Montenegrin people of Albanian descent